is a railway station in Shinagawa, Tokyo, Japan, operated by the private railway operator Keikyu Corporation.

Lines
Keikyu
Main Line

Layout
Aomono-yokochō Station is an elevated station with two side platforms serving two tracks. The station is barrier-free and is equipped with an escalator and an elevator outside the gate and the entrance to the concourse as well as a multi-functional toilet in the concourse inside the ticket gates.

Platforms

History 
The station opened on May 8, 1904. It became an Express stop station with the start of direct operation with Toei Subway Asakusa Line on June 21, 1968. The northbound line was elevated on June 25, 1989, with the remaining southbound line being elevated on December 2, 1990. Usage of a new elevated station building started on December 16, 1991. Lengthening of the station to accommodate 12-car trains was finished on October 4, 1997. A station melody was introduced on December 14, 2008. With the implementation of the revised timetable and the renaming of Express services to Airport Express, the station became a stop on May 16, 2010. Keikyu introduced station numbering to its stations on 21 October, 2010; Aomono-yokochō was assigned station number KK04.

Origin of the name 
The name "Aomono Yokocho" originates in the Edo period, when farmers brought fruits to markets in this area. It is the only train station in Japan with "Yokocho" (Alley) in its name.

References

External links

  

Railway stations in Japan opened in 1904
Railway stations in Tokyo